Germain Iglesias is a retired Peruvian soccer midfielder who played professionally in the North American Soccer League, Major Indoor Soccer League and Western Soccer Alliance.

While born in Peru, Iglesias grew up in Paterson, New Jersey.  He attended Paterson Catholic High School where he set the Passaic County high school single season scoring record with 42 goals.  He then attended St. Francis College and played amateur soccer with the Brooklyn Dodgers S.C. of the Cosmopolitan Soccer League.  In 1979, the Dodgers won the National Challenge Cup.  In 1981, he signed with the Buffalo Stallions of the Major Indoor Soccer League.  He was the 1981-1982 MISL Rookie of the Year.  He spent two seasons with the Stallions before outdoors with the Golden Bay Earthquakes of the North American Soccer League.  He remained with the Earthquakes for two seasons, including the 1983-1984 indoor season.  The Earthquakes did not play indoor soccer during the 1984-1985 season and in February 1985, Iglesias went on loan with the Chicago Sting.  In 1985, he returned to the San Jose Earthquakes in the Western Alliance Challenge Series.

Yearly Awards
 MISL Rookie of the Year: 1981-82

References

External links
NASL/MISL stats

1959 births
Living people
Buffalo Stallions players
Chicago Sting (MISL) players
San Jose Earthquakes (1974–1988) players
Major Indoor Soccer League (1978–1992) players
North American Soccer League (1968–1984) players
North American Soccer League (1968–1984) indoor players
Paterson Catholic High School alumni
Peruvian emigrants to the United States
St. Francis College alumni
Western Soccer Alliance players
Sportspeople from Lima
St. Francis Brooklyn Terriers men's soccer players
Association football midfielders
American soccer players
Brooklyn Italians players
Cosmopolitan Soccer League players
Soccer players from New Jersey
Sportspeople from Paterson, New Jersey